The term eco-warrior is a self-description for an environmental activist that adopts a "hands-on" effort to save a plot of land. In the UK it  coined the term in the 1990s, a label that many people actively taking ecological direct action resisted, for philosophical reasons.  

A common symbol of an  eco-warrior is the Eco Warriors Flag.

Another use of the term refers to an environmental activist who engages in illegal activities, also known as eco-terrorism. However, an eco-warrior is also someone who utilizes the courts to halt, suspend, or otherwise derail a human activity that the activist believes adversely impacts the environment.

Types
An eco-warrior can be someone who engages in an environmental organisation (e.g. Greenpeace) or an environmental company that delivers safekeeping or improvements for the environment (e.g. directly by selling environmental products).

Notable eco-warriors and warrior actions 
 In 2006, an eco-warrior group who sabotaged heavily polluting terrain vehicles became known in Paris (France), calling themselves "Les Dégonflés".
 Another well-known British "eco-warrior" is Daniel Hooper, who is also known as Swampy.
 Chico Mendes and Ken Saro-Wiwa are the most famous green activists in Brazil and Nigeria, respectively.
 Made famous in the US for a hurling a brick through the window of a McDonald's during the so-called "Battle in Seattle", French activist and small-scale cheese farmer José Bové has been fighting neo-liberalism on his home turf for decades.
 Paul Watson and the direct-action conservation group known as the Sea Shepherd Conservation Society, which he founded, can be called eco-warriors for their direct engagements of ships engaging in overfishing and commercial whaling.
 Penti Baihua is an internationally known Huaorani. The Huaorani, like many other indigenous peoples, are very much interested in putting a stop to illegal logging on their homeland, and also embrace the concept of ecotourism to supply in funds to help in the protection of their local biodiversity.
  Timothy Treadwell was an activist for the protection of grizzly bears in Alaska.
 The direct action of William Bunting saved the wildlife habitat of Thorne Moors from the planned dumping of 32 million tons of fuel-ash, peat-cutting and drainage, and caused the reinstatement of public footpaths on maps of the same Moors.

See also 
 Eco Warriors Flag

References

Environmentalism